How to Train Your Dragon is an action-adventure game based upon the film of the same name. It was developed by Étranges Libellules and published by Activision on March 23, 2010, for the Wii, Xbox 360, PlayStation 3 and the Nintendo DS. The game enables players to create their own dragons and move through a series of levels, or to fight amongst friends. It has received generally mixed reviews from critics.

Gameplay and premise
The game takes place a year after the movie's ending. After defeating the Red Death, as a form of celebration, the Tribe has created a festival which they call "Thor'sday Thursday". On this festival, the Vikings always hold a dragon tournament and all of the teenagers are encouraged to participate with the dragons that they've trained. Players can play as either Astrid or Hiccup, the main human characters of the film. (Although Hiccup has his leg, he lost it in the film.) Before entering the actual tournament, players must use the training grounds to train their dragon to fight. After entering the tournament, they must defeat all of the other opponents and, eventually, win the dragon tournament (by defeating Snotlout Jorgenson) and be named dragon-taming champion. The player can create and customize their own dragon in the dragon den, where they also take care of the dragons, feeding it food the players have found all around Berk, the setting of the series.

After finishing dragon fights, players have to help Gobber gather ingredients for some food for the dragons. The ingredients are all located in the Wild Zone. To unlock the Wild Zone, the player must help a handyman Viking to repair the bridge connecting to the Wild Zone by navigating around Berk, borrowing tools from other Vikings. In the Wild Zone, the player can also enter caves and complete mini games with their dragon.

The game also has online features.

Reception

The game received generally mixed or average reviews. On Metacritic, the Xbox 360 version received a score of 58 out of 100. Gaming Trend gave the review "From my perspective, this title fails to find its audience – it doesn't deliver enough content for the older kids, and the frustration factor is too high for younger kids. I'd say you could catch this one when Toys R' Us runs their next 2-for-1 sale, but I'd be hard pressed to recommend it at full retail price." IGN gave the PlayStation 3 and Xbox 360 versions a score of 4.6.

References

External links
 

2010 video games
Étranges Libellules games
Fantasy video games
How to Train Your Dragon
Multiplayer and single-player video games
Nintendo DS games
PlayStation 3 games
Video games about dragons
Video games based on adaptations
Video games based on films
Video games based on Norse mythology
Video games based on works by Chris Sanders
Video games developed in France
Video games scored by Stephen Barton
Video games set in Northern Europe
Video games set in the Viking Age
Video games set on fictional islands
Wii games
Xbox 360 games